Daya Shankar Singh is an Indian politician and a member of 18th Legislative Assembly of Uttar Pradesh representing Ballia Nagar. He is a member of the Bharatiya Janata Party as well as the state vice-president of the party.

Personal life
Daya Shankar Singh was born to Vindyachal Singh and hails from Rajpur village in the Buxar district of Bihar. He is a postgraduate and has a Masters of Arts in Medieval History from Lucknow University, received in 1998. Singh is a businessperson and a lawyer by profession. He is married to politician Swati Singh and lives in Lucknow.

Political career
Active in the politics of Ballia, Singh started his career in 1991 by contesting in student union elections in Lucknow University as an ABVP candidate. He was the national secretary and vice president of the Bharatiya Janata Yuva Morcha. Singh had also contested unsuccessfully from Ballia in the 2007 Uttar Pradesh Legislative Assembly election.

In the 2022 Uttar Pradesh Legislative Assembly election, Singh represented Bharatiya Janata Party as a candidate from Ballia Nagar constituency and went on to defeat Samajwadi Party's Narad Rai by a margin of 23,239 votes, succeeding own party member Anand Swaroop Shukla in the process.

Singh assumed office as the Minister of Transport on 25 March 2022.

References

1970s births
Living people
Bharatiya Janata Party politicians from Uttar Pradesh
Uttar Pradesh MLAs 2022–2027
People from Ballia district
People from Buxar district
Year of birth missing (living people)